Freihausen is a small village in the municipality of Seubersdorf in the German state of Bavaria. It is in the Upper Palatinate, in the Neumarkt district. It has a total population of 230 people.

Geography
The village lies about 19 kilometers south-east from Neumarkt, on the Franconian Jura.
The Wissinger Laber arises south-east from Freihausen.

Climate
The climate in Freihausen is categorized in the Köppen climate classification as Dfb (humid continental). The average temperature of 7.7 °C is slightly below the German average (7.8 °C), the average precipitation of 735 mm per year above the German average (approximately 700 mm).

External links
 Freihausen on the homepage of the municipality of Seubersdorf

References 

Neumarkt (district)
Villages in Bavaria